Fitch Glacier is a tributary glacier that flows south along the east side of the McGregor Range to enter Man-o-War Glacier in the Admiralty Mountains of northeastern Victoria Land, Antarctica. It was mapped by the United States Geological Survey from surveys and U.S. Navy air photos taken in the years 1960–62. It was named by the Advisory Committee on Antarctic Names for Lieutenant E.E. Fitch, U.S. Navy, medical officer at Hallett Station, 1963.

See also
 List of glaciers in the Antarctic
 Glaciology

References 

Admiralty Mountains
Glaciers of Borchgrevink Coast